Argyroglottis is a genus of flowering plants in the family Asteraceae.

The genus is monotypic, that is, there is only one species, Argyroglottis turbinata, which is endemic to Western Australia.

References

Gnaphalieae
Monotypic Asteraceae genera
Eudicots of Western Australia
Taxa named by Nikolai Turczaninow
Plants described in 1851